Leopold Barschandt (12 August 1925 – 5 October 2000) was an Austrian footballer.

International career
Barschandt earned 23 caps and scored 1 goal for the Austria national football team from 1954 to 1960, and participated in the 1954 FIFA World Cup and the 1958 FIFA World Cup.

Honours
Austrian Football Bundesliga (2):
 1958, 1959

References

External links
 

1925 births
2000 deaths
Austrian footballers
Austria international footballers
1954 FIFA World Cup players
1958 FIFA World Cup players
Austrian Football Bundesliga players

Association football defenders